John Kenny (born 1957) is a British trombonist and composer.

Career 
Kenny is a professor at the Guildhall School of Music and Drama and at the Royal Conservatoire of Scotland. He received the Gaudeamus International Interpreters Award in 1983 and the International Trombone Association Lifetime Achievement Award in 2017.

Kenny was part of the team which created the modern reconstruction of the Carnyx horn and has subsequently performed and recorded on the instrument.

References

External links 
Carnyx & Co.
Warwick Music - John's Publisher
Thank you, John Kenny ...for an open-ended life-long collaboration.

Living people
Scottish classical composers
20th-century classical composers
21st-century classical composers
Scottish classical trombonists
Male trombonists
Scottish jazz trombonists
British male classical composers
Composers for trombone
Recipients of the Gaudeamus International Interpreters Award
Alumni of the Royal Academy of Music
1957 births
20th-century Scottish musicians
21st-century classical trombonists
20th-century classical trombonists
20th-century British composers
20th-century British male musicians
21st-century British male musicians
British male jazz musicians